Kevin Welch-Kennedy (born 1952), is a male former weightlifter who competed for Great Britain and England.

Weightlifting career
Pinsent represented Great Britain in the 1976 Summer Olympics and the 1980 Summer Olympics.

He represented England in the 67.5 kg lightweight division, at the 1978 Commonwealth Games in Edmonton, Alberta, Canada.

References

1952 births
English male weightlifters
Weightlifters at the 1978 Commonwealth Games
Weightlifters at the 1976 Summer Olympics
Weightlifters at the 1980 Summer Olympics
Olympic weightlifters of Great Britain
Living people
Commonwealth Games competitors for England